The Daily Courier is a newspaper for Yavapai County, Arizona, owned by Western News & Info.

It has been in existence since 1882. Western News & Info, Inc. publishes both print and online editions of The Daily Courier, featuring local, regional, national, and international news and opinions. In addition to its primary circulation in Prescott, Arizona, subsidiary editions are also published throughout Yavapai County, including in Prescott Valley, Chino Valley, and Camp Verde.

References

External links
 
 

Newspapers published in Arizona
Daily newspapers published in the United States
Publications established in 1882